Nasir Khan may refer to:

Nasir Khan (actor), Indian film actor
Nasir Khan (Afghan cricketer), born 1998, Afghan cricketer
Nasir Khan (Pakistani cricketer), born 1975, Pakistani cricketer
Nasir Khan (FATA politician), Pakistani politician
Nasir Khan (PTI politician), Pakistani politician
Nasir Khan, fictional character and protagonist in The Night Of

See also
Nazir Ahmed Khan (1904-1983), Pakistani film actor, director and producer